The men's 200 metre breaststroke event at the 1956 Olympic Games took place between 30 November and 6 December. This swimming event used the breaststroke. Because an Olympic-size swimming pool is 50 metres long, this race consisted of four lengths of the pool.

Medalists

Results

Heats

Three heats were held; the swimmers with the fastest eight times advanced to the Finals.  The athletes that advanced are highlighted.

Heat One

Heat Two

Heat Three

Final

A loophole in the rules allowed swimmers to swim below the surface of the water, which was quicker and more efficient, with Furukawa spending 75% of the race underwater. Underwater swimming was banned in early 1957.

Key: DSQ = Disqualified

References

Men's breaststroke 200 metre
Men's events at the 1956 Summer Olympics